Feast is a 2014 American 2D animated romantic comedy short film written and directed by Patrick Osborne from a story of Raymond S. Persi and Nicole Mitchell, and produced by Walt Disney Animation Studios. It made its world premiere on June 10, 2014, at the Annecy International Animated Film Festival and debuted in theaters with Big Hero 6 on November 7, 2014. The short is about a Boston Terrier named Winston, who, since he is adopted by James, is fed junk food, but a waitress named Kirby wants him to have a healthy diet.

The short won both an Academy Award for Best Animated Short Film at the 87th Academy Awards, and the Annie Award for Best Animated Short Subject at the 42nd Annie Awards.

Plot
While licking at discarded fast food wrappers, a stray male Boston Terrier puppy spots a French fry dropped on the ground and eats it. James, the man who dropped the fry, offers a second one to the puppy and decides to adopt him as his pet. James names him Winston and begins feeding him portions of his own meals and junk food in addition to regular kibble.

One day, James begins a relationship with Kirby, a waitress at a local restaurant. She persuades him to take up a healthier diet and lifestyle, but the change upsets Winston as the leftovers James slips to him now consist of vegetables, which disgust him. However, the couple break up after an argument, sending James into a deep depression and causing him to revert to his old eating habits. Winston is initially gleeful to eat junk food again, but he soon recognizes James's low spirits. Seeing a piece of parsley that has reminded James of Kirby and the meals they used to prepare together, Winston decides to bring them back together and steals it, leading to a chase as he brings it to Kirby and overcomes several temptations of delicious food. James follows Winston to the restaurant, where he reconciles with Kirby, and the two marry soon afterward. Winston, relieved that his master is happy again, is initially content to eat normal dog food.

Some time after the couple have moved into a new house, Winston spots a couple of meatballs that have rolled across the kitchen floor and eats them. Following the trail of sauce they have left behind, he reaches the base of a high chair occupied by the couple's infant child, who happily throws another meatball to him. As the film ends, Winston gets ready to feast on a tray of cupcakes knocked off a table by a guest at the baby's first birthday party.

Voice cast
 Ben Bledsoe
 Stewart Levine
 Katie Lowes
 Brandon Scott
 Adam Shapiro
 Tommy Snider
 Stephen Apostolina

Production

Development

Prior to working on Feast, Patrick Osborne was co-head of animation on Big Hero 6. The idea for the short film started from an app called 1secondeveryday, which allows a user to record 1-second-long video snippets each day and cut them into a movie. Osborne used the app to create a film of dinners he ate in 2012, which he thought could form the basis for a nice short film.

Following the previous Walt Disney Animation Studios short films Paperman and Get a Horse!, the studio decided to formalize a program for pitching shorts. Pixar had long had a steady system for producing short films to accompany theatrical releases, but it was something that Disney Animation no longer generally did. The program was open to pitches from any Walt Disney Animation Studios employee. Osborne pitched his idea to tell a story about a family from the perspective of their dog through the meals they eat. The project was green-lit in October 2013, with a deadline of June 10, 2014, for premiere at Annecy; Feast was completed three days before the festival. Feast was the first film that Osborne has directed.

Animation and style
Feast was animated using the Meander system developed for Paperman, and was the first time the tool was used in color. Feast was rendered using Hyperion, the rendering system built for Big Hero 6.

The characters and environment feature a line-free style with solid blocks of color. The camera focused on Winston and the food while leaving the human characters generally out of focus. Because the film consists of a series of very brief scenes cut together, the foods portrayed had to be appetizing and recognizable at first glance.

Winston was made a Boston Terrier for three main reasons. The filmmakers wanted a breed that does not appear in any prior Disney film. The breed is small so that he can be shown being promoted to a chair at the table and demoted back to the floor. Because of the flat style of the film, a breed with distinct markings like the Boston Terrier helps cue the audience to subtle movements.

Home media
Feast made its home media debut on the Blu-ray and DVD releases of Big Hero 6 on February 24, 2015. Feast is also included with the digital iTunes release of Big Hero 6. Feast was released on the Walt Disney Animation Studios Short Films Collection Blu-ray on August 18, 2015.

Reception

Critical response
Writing for Variety, critic Peter Debruge described the audience reaction at the Annecy International Animated Film Festival, saying that "to call 'Feast' a hit with that crowd would be an understatement". As the credits rolled, the audience clapped loudly and stomped their feet on the bleacher seating.

Accolades
Feast won the Annie Award for Best Animated Short Subject at the 42nd Annie Awards and the Academy Award for Best Animated Short Film at the 87th Academy Awards.

Parody
Feast is parodied at the beginning of the episode "Friend with Benefit" of the twenty-seventh season of the animated series The Simpsons.

References

External links
 
 

2010s English-language films
2010s buddy films
2014 romantic comedy films
2014 3D films
2014 animated films
Animated romance films
Best Animated Short Academy Award winners
Best Animated Short Subject Annie Award winners
2010s Disney animated short films
Films about food and drink
Animated films without speech
2014 short films
2014 films
3D animated short films
American animated short films
Animated films about dogs